The mayor of Meridian, Mississippi is elected every four years by the population at large. Being the chief executive officer of the city, the mayor is responsible for administering and leading the day-to-day operations of city government. The current mayor of the city is Jimmie Smith, who was elected in 2021.

City Hall is located at 601 24th Avenue; the mayor's office is located on the second floor of the building.

List of mayors

Nineteenth century

Twentieth Century

Twenty-first century

References
 – Lists all mayors between 1869 and 1977.

Notes

External links
Official website of Meridian, Mississippi

 
Meridian, Mississippi